Brenda Ray Moryck (June 1894 – 1949) was an American writer associated with the Harlem Renaissance.

Early life and education 
Brenda Ray Moryck was born in Newark, New Jersey, the daughter of John W. Moryck and Sarah Rose Ray Moryck. Her father was a businessman, and her mother was an educator and clubwoman; her great-grandfather was the abolitionist editor Charles Bennett Ray. Her great-aunts included Charlotte E. Ray and Cordelia Ray.

Moryck completed a bachelor's degree from Wellesley College in 1916, the only black graduate in her class. She earned a master's degree in English literature from Howard University in 1926.

Career 
Moryck worked for the Newark Bureau of Charities after college, and taught physical culture at a technical school in Bordentown. She taught English and drama at Armstrong Manual Training School in Washington, D.C. during the 1920s. She wrote essays and stories published in The Crisis, Opportunity, and other national periodicals and newspapers. She was also a drama critic for the New York Age, and wrote at least one play, The Christmas Spirit, performed at Armstrong high school in 1927. She was active in the National Urban League, the Harlem YWCA, and the NAACP in New York. She was also an avid golfer.

Moryck's writings are associated with the Harlem Renaissance and have been included in several recent anthologies, among them The new Negro: Readings on race, representation, and African American culture, 1892-1938 (2007), edited by Henry Louis Gates Jr. and Gene Andrew Garrett, Double-take: A revisionist Harlem Renaissance anthology (2001), edited by Venetria K. Patton and Maureen Honey, Harlem's Glory: Black women writing, 1900-1950 (1996), edited by Lorraine Elena Roses and Ruth Elizabeth Randolph, and Speech & power: The African-American essay and its cultural content, from polemics to pulpit (1992). edited by Gerald Early. She had an unpublished novel in manuscript at the time of her death.

Personal life 
Moryck married twice. Her first husband was Lucius Lee Jordan; they married in 1917 and he died before their first anniversary. She married Robert Beale Francke in 1930. She had a daughter, Betty Osborne Francke,  and a foster daughter, July Wormley. She died in 1949, in Washington, D.C., in her fifties.

References

External links 

 "Johnsons, John B. Nail, John E. Nail, Grayce Fairfax Nail, Brenda Moryck, Bertha Randolph, Clara Wood, Great Barrington, Massachusetts", a photograph of Moryck and others taken in 1928, from the James Weldon Johnson and Grace Nail Johnson papers, Beinecke Rare Book & Manuscript Library, Yale University.

1894 births
1949 deaths
African-American women writers
African-American educators
Wellesley College alumni
People from Newark, New Jersey
20th-century African-American women
20th-century African-American people
20th-century American people